Fomin , or Fomina (feminine; Фомина), is a common Russian surname that is derived from the male given name Foma and literally means Foma's. It may refer to:

Masculine form
Aleksandr Fomin (botanist) (1869–1935), Russian/Soviet botanist and academician
Aleksandr Fomin, alias of Soviet spy Alexander Feklisov (1914–2007), known for receiving information from Julius Rosenberg and his contacts during the Cuban Missile Crisis
Andriy Fomin (born 1977), Ukrainian Olympic speedskater
Artyom Fomin (born 1988), Russian football player
Boris Fomin (1900–1948), Russian composer of folk music
Daniil Fomin (born 1997), Russian football player
Denis Fomin (born 1996), Russian football defender 
Dmitry Fomin (born 1968), Russian Olympic volleyball player
Fedor Fomin (born 1968), Russian/Norwegian computer scientist
Ivan Fomin (1872–1936), a Russian/Soviet architect
Margarita Fomina (born 1988), Russian curler
Mitya Fomin (born 1974), Russian singer, dancer and producer
Mykola Fomin (1909–1974), Ukrainian football player
Nikolai Fomin, chief engineer at the Chernobyl Nuclear Power Plant during the Chernobyl disaster
Ruslan Fomin (born 1986), a Ukrainian football player
Semyon Fomin (born 1989), Russian football player
Sergei Fomin (1917–1975), Russian mathematician
Sergey Fomin (born 1958), Russian/American mathematician
Viktor Fomin (1929–2007), a Soviet football player
Volodymyr Fomin (1902–1942), Ukrainian football player and coach
Vyacheslav Fomin (born 1969), Russian football player
Yefim Fomin (1909–1941), Soviet political commissar
Yevstigney Fomin (1761–1800), Russian opera composer

Feminine form
Alona Fomina (born 1989), Ukrainian tennis player
Anastasia Fomina (born 1983), Russian basketball player
Elena Fomina (born 1979), Russian footballer
Margarita Fomina (born 1988), Russian curler
Oleksandra Fomina (born 1966), Ukraininan Olympic volleyball player
Tatyana Fomina (born 1954), Estonian chess player

Places
Fomin (village), a village (khutor) in Rostov Oblast, Russia
A.V. Fomin Botanical Garden, in Kyiv, Ukraine (named after the botanist Alexandr Fomin)

Russian-language surnames